Putrescine is an organic compound with the formula (CH2)4(NH2)2. It is a colorless solid that melts near room temperature. It is classified as a diamine.  Together with cadaverine, it is largely responsible for the foul odor of putrefying flesh, but also contributes to other unpleasant odors.

Production
Putrescine is produced on an industrial scale by the hydrogenation of succinonitrile.

Biotechnological production of putrescine from renewable feedstock has been investigated. A metabolically engineered strain of Escherichia coli that produces putrescine at high concentrations in glucose mineral salts medium has been described.

Biochemistry

Spermidine synthase uses putrescine and S-adenosylmethioninamine (decarboxylated S-adenosyl methionine) to produce spermidine. Spermidine in turn is combined with another S-adenosylmethioninamine and gets converted to spermine.

Putrescine is synthesized in small quantities by healthy living cells by the action of ornithine decarboxylase.

Putrescine is synthesized biologically via two different pathways, both starting from arginine. 
 In one pathway, arginine is converted into agmatine. The conversion is catalyzed by the enzyme arginine decarboxylase (ADC). Agmatine is transformed into N-carbamoylputrescine by agmatine imino hydroxylase (AIH).  Finally, N-carbamoylputrescine  is hydrolyzed to give putrescine.
 In the second pathway, arginine is converted into ornithine and then ornithine is converted into putrescine by ornithine decarboxylase (ODC).

Occurrence
Putrescine is found in all organisms. Putrescine is widely found in plant tissues, often being the most common polyamine present within the organism. Putrescine's role in development is well documented, but recent studies have suggested that putrescine also plays a role in stress responses in plants, both to biotic and abiotic stressors. The absence of putrescine in plants is associated with an increase in both parasite and fungal population in plants.

Putrescine serves an important role in a multitude of ways, which include: a cation substitute, an osmolyte, or a transport protein. It also serves as an important regulator in a variety of surface proteins, both on the cell surface and on organelles, such as the mitochondria and chloroplasts. A recorded increase of ATP production has been found in mitochondria and ATP synthesis by chloroplasts with an increase in mitochondrial and chloroplastic Putrescine, but putrescine has also been shown to function as a developmental inhibitor in some plants, which can be seen as dwarfism and late flowering in Arabiadopsis plants.

Putrescine production in plants can also be promoted by fungi in the soil. Piriformospora indica (P. indica) is one such fungus, found to promote putrescine production in Arabidopsis and common garden tomato plants. In a 2022 study it was shown that the presence of this fungus had a promotional effect on the growth of the root structure of plants. After gas chromatography testing, putrescine was found in higher amounts in these root structures.

Plants that had been inoculated with P. indica had presented an excess of arginine decarboxylase. This is used in the process of making putrescine in plant cells. One of the downstream effects of putrescine in root cells is the production of auxin. That same study found that putrescine added as a fertilizer showed the same results as if it was inoculated with the fungus, which was also shown in Arabidopsis and barley. The evolutionary foundations of this connection and putrescine are still unclear.

Putrescine is a component of bad breath and bacterial vaginosis. It is also found in semen and some microalgae, together with spermine and spermidine.

Uses 
Putrescine reacts with adipic acid to yield the polyamide nylon 46, which is marketed by DSM under the trade name Stanyl.

Application of putrescine, along with other polyamines, can be used to extend the shelf life of fruits by delaying the ripening process. Pre-harvest application of putrescine has been shown to increase plant resistance to high temperatures and drought. Both of these effects seem to result from lowered ethylene production following exogenous putrescine exposure.

Due to its role in putrification, putrescine has also been proposed as a biochemical marker for determining how long a corpse has been decomposing.

History
Putrescine and cadaverine were first described in 1885 by the Berlin physician Ludwig Brieger (1849–1919).

Toxicity
In rats, putrescine has a low acute oral toxicity of 2000 mg/kg body weight, with no-observed-adverse-effect level of 2000 ppm (180 mg/kg body weight/day).

Further reading

References

External links
 Putrescine MS Spectrum

Diamines
Foul-smelling chemicals
NMDA receptor antagonists
1,4-Butanediyl compounds